Chrysochlorininae is a subfamily of flies in the family Stratiomyidae.

Genera
Cacosis Walker, 1851
Chromatopoda Brauer, 1882
Chrysochlora Latreille, 1829
Chrysochlorina James, 1939
Labogastria Enderlein, 1914
Pelagomyia Williston, 1896
Porpocera Enderlein, 1914
Trichocercocera Lindner, 1928

References

Stratiomyidae
Brachycera subfamilies